

Group A

Head coach:

Head coach:

Head coach:

Head coach:

Group B

Head coach:

Head coach:

Head coach:

The team that will be representing the United States in the men's tournament is as follows:

|}
| style="vertical-align:top;" |
 Head coach

 Assistant coach

 Team Leader

Legend
 Club denotes current club; nationality is of (first) club listed
 alt. denotes alternates
 Positions:
 G: Goalkeeper
 P: Pivot
 CB: Centre Back
 LW: Left Wing
 RW: Right Wing
 LB: Left Back
 RB: Right Back
|}

References

External links
Official website
Squads of each country

Team squads at the 2011 Pan American Games
Handball at the 2011 Pan American Games
Pan American Games handball squads